Vladimír Luka (born March 7, 1982) is a Czech professional ice hockey player. He is currently playing for the Telford Tigers of the National Ice Hockey League.

Luka made his Czech Extraliga debut playing with HC Oceláři Třinec during the 2015-16 Czech Extraliga season.

References

External links

1982 births
Living people
HC Oceláři Třinec players
Czech ice hockey forwards
Sportspeople from Karviná
HC Havířov players
Telford Tigers players
Sheffield Scimitars players
Hokej Šumperk 2003 players
HC Frýdek-Místek players
VHK Vsetín players
KH Zagłębie Sosnowiec players
Czech expatriate ice hockey people
Czech expatriate sportspeople in Poland
Czech expatriate sportspeople in England
Expatriate ice hockey players in Poland
Expatriate ice hockey players in England